Raphia frater, the brother moth or simply the brother, is a moth of the family Noctuidae. It is found from Nova Scotia west, across the forested regions of Canada to British Columbia, south to Mississippi in the east. The southern limits in the west are uncertain due to confusion with several closely related species or forms.

The wingspan is 38–44 mm. Adults are on wing from April or May to August. There is one or two generations per year.

The larvae mainly feed on aspen, but have also been recorded from alder, birch, cottonwood, and willow.

Subspecies
Raphia frater frater (Prairie Provinces, in the east south of the Great Lakes region into Pennsylvania, Ohio and Indiana; In the West, it occurs south along mid-elevation mountain ranges of the Pacific Northwest into Washington, and southward along the Rocky Mountains. Specimens from high elevations in Colorado and New Mexico)
Raphia frater abrupta Grote, 1864 (Maryland, Oklahoma and Texas)
Raphia frater cinderella Smith, 1903 (central and southern California west of the Sierra Nevada)
Raphia frater coloradensis Putnam-Cramer, 1886 (from British Columbia, south in the mountains to at least Colorado and Utah and northeast to southern Alberta)
Raphia frater elbea Smith, 1908 (from south-eastern Utah and western New Mexico southward through Arizona into northern Mexico)
Raphia frater piazzi Hill, 1927 (central and southern Texas)

References

External links
Images

Raphiinae (moth)
Moths of North America
Moths described in 1864
Taxa named by Augustus Radcliffe Grote